Riversul is a municipality in the state of São Paulo in Brazil. The population is 5,443 (2020 est.) in an area of 386 km². The elevation is 587m. Its original name was Ribeirão Vermelho do Sul (trans.: "Red Southern Creek"), but due to a homonymous municipality, its name was contracted to this current form in 1980.

References

External links
 Riversul municipality webpage in Brazilian Portuguese

Municipalities in São Paulo (state)